Bedlam is a small village in the Harrogate district of North Yorkshire, England situated north of Harrogate.

Its name most likely came from Old English (æt) Botlum = "at the buildings" (with a dative plural case ending), or its Old Norse equivalent, and not the same origin as Bedlam insane asylum. There is also a Bedlam, Shropshire.

References

External links

Villages in North Yorkshire
Nidderdale